Axiothea of Phlius was a female student of Plato and Speusippus. She was born in Phlius, which was under Spartan rule when Plato founded his Academy. Axiothea is said by Themistius to have read Plato's Republic and then traveled to Athens to be his student. According to Dicearchus, Axiothea dressed as a man during her time at Plato's Academy. After Plato's death she continued her studies with Speusippus, Plato's nephew.

References

4th-century BC Greek people
4th-century BC philosophers
Classical Greek philosophers
Ancient Greek women philosophers
Academic philosophers
Ancient Phliasians
4th-century BC Greek women
Female-to-male cross-dressers